Zir Zard-e Alishahi (also Romanized as Zīr Zard-e ‘Alīshāhī; also known as Zir-e Rūd and Zīr-e Zard) is a village in Javid-e Mahuri Rural District, in the Central District of Mamasani County, Fars Province, Iran. At the 2006 census, its population was 83, in 19 families.

References 

Populated places in Mamasani County